The Dutch Eredivisie in the 1971–72 season was contested by 18 teams. Ajax won the championship. Third placed FC Twente had a Eredivisie record-low goals against of 13 goals.

League standings

Results

See also
 1971–72 Eerste Divisie
 1971–72 KNVB Cup

References

 Eredivisie official website - info on all seasons 
 RSSSF

Eredivisie seasons
Netherlands
1